Kildare was a parliamentary constituency represented in Dáil Éireann, the lower house of the Irish parliament or Oireachtas from 1923 to 1937 and from 1948 to 1997. The method of election was proportional representation by means of the single transferable vote (PR-STV).

History and boundaries 
Covering all or part of County Kildare, the constituency existed for two distinct periods: from 1923 to 1937, and from 1948 to 1997. From 1923 to 1937 Kildare elected 3 deputies (Teachtaí Dála, commonly known as TDs), until it was absorbed into a new Carlow–Kildare constituency in 1937. After its re-establishment in 1948 it initially elected 3 TDs. This was increased to 4 seats in 1961, reduced again to 3 in 1969, and increased to 5 from 1981 until its abolition in 1997. Its boundaries were significantly revised on several occasions.

The constituency was abolished for the 1997 general election, when it was replaced by two new constituencies: Kildare North and Kildare South.

TDs

TDs 1923–1937

TDs 1948–1997

Elections

1992 general election

1989 general election

1987 general election

November 1982 general election

February 1982 general election

1981 general election

1977 general election

1973 general election

1970 by-election
Following the death of Fine Gael TD Gerard Sweetman, a by-election was held on 14 April 1970. The seat was won by the Fine Gael candidate Patrick Malone.

1969 general election

1965 general election

1964 by-election 
Following the death of Labour Party TD William Norton, a by-election was held on 19 February 1964. The seat was won by the Fianna Fáil candidate Terence Boylan.

1961 general election

1957 general election

1954 general election

1951 general election

1948 general election

1933 general election

1932 general election

1931 by-election 
Following the death of Labour Party TD Hugh Colohan, a by-election was held on 29 June 1931. The seat was won by the Fianna Fáil candidate Thomas Harris.

September 1927 general election

June 1927 general election

1923 general election

See also 
Dáil constituencies
Politics of the Republic of Ireland
Historic Dáil constituencies
Elections in the Republic of Ireland

References

External links 
Oireachtas Members Database

Dáil constituencies in the Republic of Ireland (historic)
Historic constituencies in County Kildare
1923 establishments in Ireland
1937 disestablishments in Ireland
Constituencies established in 1923
Constituencies disestablished in 1937
1948 establishments in Ireland
1997 disestablishments in Ireland
Constituencies established in 1948
Constituencies disestablished in 1997